Lake Tarleton State Park is a  state park in Piermont, New Hampshire, on Lake Tarleton. It features an unguarded swimming beach and opportunities for fishing and hunting in season. The park is undeveloped. Activities include swimming, canoeing, fishing, hiking and picnicking.

References

External links
 Lake Tarleton State Park New Hampshire Department of Natural and Cultural Resources

State parks of New Hampshire
Parks in Grafton County, New Hampshire